The 2012 Canada–Russia Challenge was a four-game international ice hockey tournament between Canadian and Russian junior teams, held in Canada and Russia on August 9–14, 2012, commemorating the 40th anniversary of the 1972 Summit Series, as well as honouring the memory of the 2011 Lokomotiv Yaroslavl plane crash.

Games

Being a four-game series with each team winning twice, a tie-breaking overtime was required to determine the series winner. Canada's Ryan Strome scored at 3:20 of the 20-minute sudden death period to win the series for Canada.

Statistics

 Includes Ryan Stromes overtime goal for players, but does not count against Andrei Vasilevski because of the lack of information regarding total overtime shots.

References

Canada men's national junior ice hockey team games
Canada–Russia relations
Sport in Yaroslavl
Sport in Halifax, Nova Scotia
Junior ice hockey in Russia
International ice hockey competitions hosted by Russia
International ice hockey competitions hosted by Canada
Challenge
Challenge
Russia men's national ice hockey team games
Super Series